Ember is glowing hot coals from carbon-based material.

Ember most commonly refers to:
Ember days, fasting days within Western Christian churches
Ember (film), a 2016 Turkish film
Ember (video game), a 2016 role-playing video game

Ember may also refer to:

Fictional characters
Ember McLain, a fictional character from the animated series Danny Phantom
Ember Evergreen, a fictional character from the web series Project Mc²
Princess Ember, a fictional character from the animated series My Little Pony: Friendship is Magic
Ember Lumen, a fictional character from the upcoming animated Pixar film Elemental

Locations
Ember Ridge, a mountain ridge in British Columbia, Canada
The Embers (nightclub), a 1950s- and 1960s-era restaurant and nightclub

Literature
Embers (novel), a 1942 novel by the Hungarian writer Sándor Márai
The City of Ember, a book series by Jeanne DuPrau
Ember, an imprint of Random House Children's Books

Music
Embers (Californian band), Oakland
The Embers (Tasmanian band)
Will Stoker and the Embers, Perth, Australia
The Embers (El Paso band), featuring Jim Reese
Ember (album), an album by the rock band Breaking Benjamin

Organizations
Ember (company), a wireless networking chip company
Ember (coach operator), a Scottish electric intercity bus company
Ember (non-profit organisation), an environmental organisation
Ember Technologies, an American manufacturer of temperature controlled containers

People
Ember Oakley, American politician
Ember (model), model and actress

Other
Ember.js, an open-source JavaScript framework
Ember, a humanist sans-serif typeface used by Amazon
Emberger syndrome, a genetic disorder
Ember (given name)

See also
Embers (disambiguation)

English feminine given names